Mercedes-Benz SLC-Class can designate:

 The hard-top coupé counterpart of the Mercedes-Benz R107 produced from 1971 to 1981
 The Mercedes-Benz R172, the successor of the Mercedes-Benz SLK-Class R171, which has been produced since 2016

SLC